"Siamo Donne" is a duet by Sabrina and Jo Squillo. The song was released in January 1991 and appeared on Sabrina's third studio album Over the Pop, but only on the album picture disc edition.

Song information
In 1991, Sabrina teamed up with Italian starlet Jo Squillo (real name Giovanna Coletti) to record the song "Siamo Donne", which was a premiere for Sabrina in two aspects: It was her first duet, and her first Italian-language single. The pair performed the song at 1991's Sanremo music-festival (and on many TV shows), and although there was much publicity, the song did not become a big hit.

Formats and track listings
 7" Single
"Siamo Donne" - 3:38
"Siamo Donne" (Instrumental) - 3:38
 Cassette Single
"Siamo Donne" - 3:38
"With A Boy Like You" (Sabrina) - 4:46
"Whole Lotta Love" (Jo Squillo) - 2:55

Charts

References

1991 songs
Sabrina Salerno songs
Female vocal duets
Casablanca Records singles
1991 singles
Sanremo Music Festival songs